Porritt is a surname. Notable people with the surname include:

Sir Arthur Porritt, Baron Porritt, Bt, GCMG, GCVO, CBE (1900–1994), New Zealand physician, military surgeon, statesman and athlete
B. D. Porritt FRSE (1884–1940) British chemist
George Taylor Porritt (1848–1927), English naturalist who studied the peppered moth
Jonathon Porritt, CBE (born 1950), British environmentalist and writer, advocate of the Green Party
Luisa Porritt (born 1987), Liberal Democrat politician in London
Nathan Porritt (born 1990), English footballer
Richard Porritt (1901–1985), Canadian mining industry executive, inductee to the Canadian Mining Hall of Fame
Richard Whitaker Porritt (1910–1940), UK Member of Parliament for Heywood and Radcliffe, the first British MP killed in World War II
Trevor Porritt (born 1961), former Canadian field hockey player who played for the Canada men's national field hockey team
Walter Porritt (1914–1993), English professional footballer

See also
Porritt Baronets
Porrittia
Portrait
Portti